Giacomo Dondoli (active 17th – 18th century) was an Italian painter active in Verona. He studied in Verona initially under Giovanni Battista Zannoni, then under Cavalier Coppa, and then Pietro Ricchi (il Lucchese) in Trento. He painted for Charles I, Duke of Mantua. He mainly painted sacred subjects including a San Carlo for the church of the Ghiara in Verona; a Last Supper for San Fermo; a Death of Sant'Alessio for the church of the same name. He painted Nero watching Rome Burn and Story of Jacob. He was active in Verona circa 1717. His wife Caterina was also a painter.

References

17th-century births
18th-century deaths
18th-century Italian painters
Italian male painters
Painters from Verona
18th-century Italian male artists